The men's team foil competition in fencing at the 2016 Summer Olympics in Rio de Janeiro was held on 12 August at the Carioca Arena 3.

Schedule
All times are Brasília time (UTC−3)

Draw

Finals

Classification 5–8

Final classification

References

Men's foil
Men's events at the 2016 Summer Olympics